Adsul may refer to:

Adsul, Texas, an unincorporated community
Anandrao Vithoba Adsul (born 1947), an Indian politician